The 21st Los Angeles Film Critics Association Awards, honoring the best in film for 1995, were announced on 16 December 1995 and given on 15 January 1996.

Winners
Best Picture:
Leaving Las Vegas
Runner-up: A Little Princess
Best Director:
Mike Figgis – Leaving Las Vegas
Runner-up: Ang Lee – Sense and Sensibility
Best Actor:
Nicolas Cage – Leaving Las Vegas
Runner-up: Anthony Hopkins – Nixon
Best Actress:
Elisabeth Shue – Leaving Las Vegas
Runner-up: Jennifer Jason Leigh – Georgia
Best Supporting Actor:
Don Cheadle – Devil in a Blue Dress
Runner-up: Kevin Spacey – Outbreak, Seven, Swimming with Sharks and The Usual Suspects
Best Supporting Actress:
Joan Allen – Nixon
Runner-up: Mira Sorvino – Mighty Aphrodite
Best Screenplay:
Emma Thompson – Sense and Sensibility
Runner-up: Mike Figgis – Leaving Las Vegas
Best Cinematography:
Lü Yue – Shanghai Triad
Runner-up: Darius Khondji – Seven
Best Production Design:
Bo Welch - A Little Princess
Runner-up: Gary Frutkoff – Devil in a Blue Dress
Best Music Score:
Patrick Doyle – A Little Princess
Runner-up: Howard Shore – Seven
Best Foreign-Language Film:
Wild Reeds (Les roseaux sauvages) • France
Runner-up: The Postman (Il postino) • Italy/France/Belgium
Best Non-Fiction Film:
Crumb
Runner-up: Theremin: An Electronic Odyssey
Best Animation:
Toy Story
The Douglas Edwards Experimental/Independent Film/Video Award:
Mark Rappaport – From the Journals of Jean Seberg
New Generation Award:
Alfonso Cuarón – A Little Princess
Career Achievement Award:
André de Toth

References

External links
21st Annual Los Angeles Film Critics Association Awards

1995
Los Angeles Film Critics Association Awards
Los Angeles Film Critics Association Awards
Los Angeles Film Critics Association Awards
Los Angeles Film Critics Association Awards